The Microsoft Reaction Card, developed by Microsoft in 2002 by Joey Benedek and Trish Miner, is a method used to check the emotional response and desirability of a design or product. This method is commonly used in the field of software design.

Using this method involves a participant describing a design / product based on a list of 118 words. Each word is placed on a separate card. After viewing a design or product, the participant is asked to pick out the words they feel are relevant. The moderator then asks the participant to explain the reason for their selection.

References 

 http://uxmatters.com/mt/archives/2010/02/rapid-desirability-testing-a-case-study.php - online source of information
 https://www.nngroup.com/articles/microsoft-desirability-toolkit/

Microsoft culture
Software testing